129 (also known as Barge 129, or No.129) was an American whaleback barge in service between 1893 and 1902. Built between December 1892 and May 1893, in Superior, Wisconsin, (or West Superior, Wisconsin), by Alexander McDougall's American Steel Barge Company, for McDougall's fleet of the same name, based in Buffalo, New York. She was one of a class of distinctive and experimental ships designed and built by McDougall. The whalebacks were designed to be more stable in high seas. They had rounded decks, and lacked the normal straight sides seen on traditional lake freighters. 129 entered service on May 22, hauling wheat from Superior. She was sold to the Bessemer Steamship Company of Cleveland, Ohio, in 1900. In 1901, she became owned by the Pittsburgh Steamship Company of Duluth, Minnesota, when the Bessemer fleet merged into it.

On October 13, 1902, 129 was downbound, loaded with iron ore, in tow of the bulk freighter Maunaloa. However, the heavy seas pushed Maunaloa against 129; her port anchor sliced into 129s starboard side. 129 took on water and sank fast. All of her crew were rescued by Maunaloa.

History

Background

129 was a whaleback, an innovative but unpopular ship design of the late 1880s, designed by Alexander McDougall. A Scottish immigrant, Great Lakes captain, inventor and entrepreneur, McDougall developed the idea of the whaleback as a way to improve the ability of barges to follow a towing vessel in heavy seas. Whalebacks were characterized by distinctive hull shapes with rounded tops, lacking conventional vertical sides, and conoidal ends. Their rounded hulls enabled water to easily slide off their decks, minimising friction, and letting them sail quickly and smoothly through the water. Their superstructure was located on turrets mounted on the main deck. The rounded contours of whalebacks gave them an unconventional appearance, and McDougall's ship and barge designs were received with considerable skepticism, resistance, and derision. As they had porcine-looking snouts for bows, some observers called them "pig boats".

After McDougall was unable to persuade existing shipbuilders to try his designs, he founded the American Steel Barge Company in Superior, Wisconsin in 1888 and built them himself. McDougall actively promoted his design and company by sending the steamer Charles W. Wetmore to London and starting another shipyard in Everett, Washington, which built the steamer City of Everett. Despite McDougall's further efforts to promote the design with the excursion liner Christopher Columbus, whalebacks never caught on, with only 44 of them being built.

Design and construction

129 (also known as Barge 129 or No.129) was constructed between 1892 and 1893 in Superior, Wisconsin, (or West Superior, Wisconsin), by the American Steel Barge Company. Her first hull frames were laid down on December 5, 1892. She was launched on May 13, 1893. 129 was the first of six identical whaleback barges launched in spring and summer of 1893. 129 and her sister ships (130, 131, 132, 133 and 134) were the only whalebacks built by the American Steel Barge Company in 1893. She had a gross tonnage of 1,310 (or 1,311) tons and a net tonnage of 1,265 (or 1,266) tons. She was an unrigged barge and was towed by a steam-powered ship.

Service history
129 was built by the American Steel Barge Company for the fleet of the same name based in Buffalo, New York. She was given a temporary enrollment in Marquette, Michigan on May 12, 1893, and was given the US official number 53276. She received a permanent enrollment on June 3 in Buffalo, her home port. 129 entered service on May 22, carrying wheat from Superior, Wisconsin.

129 had no recountable incidents during her career. In 1895, management of the American Steel Barge Company fleet was taken over by Pickands Mather & Company of Cleveland, Ohio. In 1900, 129 and the entire American Steel Barge Company fleet was sold to the Bessemer Steamship Company of Cleveland. When sold, 129s home port was changed to Duluth, Minnesota. 129 and the Bessemer Steamship Company fleet merged into the Pittsburgh Steamship Company of Duluth, managed by Augustus B. Wolvin.

Final voyage
On October 13, 1902, while in tow of the  steel bulk freighter Maunaloa, 129 was downbound, with 2,300 tons of iron ore in her cargo hold. In the gale, the towline between 129 and Maunaloa was severed. Maunaloa turned around and attempted to retrieve 129. However, the heavy seas pushed Maunaloa against 129; her port anchor sliced into 129s starboard side. 129 took on water quickly and rapidly sank. There was no loss of life, as Captain Bailey and his crew were picked up by Maunaloa. Maunaloa sustained no major damage in the collision. 129 was a total loss, being valued at $60,000, while her cargo was valued at $10,000. Her enrollment surrendered on March 25, 1903, in Duluth, Minnesota. She was the fourth whaleback to be lost on the Great Lakes.

129 wreck

She was the last whaleback lost on the Great Lakes to be located. The wreck is in four to five large pieces, with several smaller pieces of wreckage also scattered on the lake bottom. 129 hit the bottom with such force that her bow sheared off, while the rest of her hull folded in on itself in the middle. The tow line is still attached at the bow. Darryl Ertel Jr., director of marine operations at the Great Lakes Shipwreck Historical Society described her wreck: "It's totally destroyed on the bottom. It's nowhere near intact. It's at least four to five big pieces and thousands of little pieces. It's just disintegrated." 129s wreck was explored during the summer of 2022 using a remotely operated vehicle. Maritime historian and author Cris Kohl had previously described her as one of the "100 most hunted Great Lakes shipwrecks".

Notes

References

Sources

 
 
 
 
 
 
 
 
 
  Google books has images of those pages in the chapter entitled  The Turret Steamship 
 
 
 
 
 
 
 
 
 
 
 
 
 
 
 
 

1893 ships
Ships built in Superior, Wisconsin
Maritime incidents in 1902
Whaleback ships
Shipwrecks of Lake Superior
Merchant ships of the United States
Shipwrecks of the Michigan coast